Daniel Harris may refer to:

Dan Harris (American football), college football coach and athletic director
Dan Harris (screenwriter) (born 1979), American screenwriter who co-wrote Superman Returns
Dan Harris (journalist) (born 1971), American television news correspondent
Dan Harris (politician) (born 1979), Canadian Member of Parliament
Daniel Harris (footballer) (born 1982), former Australian rules footballer
Daniel Harris (cricketer) (born 1979), cricketer for Australian domestic team Southern Redbacks
Daniel Harris (architect) (c. 1761–1840), civil engineer and architect
Danny Harris (born 1965), American hurdler
Danny Harris (rugby) (born 1937), rugby union and rugby league footballer of the 1950s and 1960s Wales (RU), Pontypridd, Cardiff, and Leigh (RL)
Daniel Harris, a character in the TV series The New Adventures of Old Christine
Daniel Gibson Harris (1915–2007), writer on Swedish naval history
Daniel J. Harris ( 1833–1890), founder of Fairhaven, Washington

See also
Daniel Harries (born 1983), Australian figure skater